Sardar Kamal Khan Bangulzai(born 13 December 1972) is a Pakistani politician who had been a member of the National Assembly of Pakistan, from June 2013 to May 2018.

Early life
He was born on 13 December 1972.

Political career
He ran for the seat of the National Assembly of Pakistan as a candidate of National Party from Constituency NA-268 (Kalat-cum-Mastung) in 2002 Pakistani general election but was unsuccessful. He received 14,638 votes and lost the seat to Abdul Ghafoor Haideri.

He was elected to the National Assembly as a candidate of National Party from Constituency NA-268 (Kalat-cum-Mastung) in 2013 Pakistani general election. He received 19,873 votes and defeated Abdul Ghafoor Haideri. In the same election, he ran for the seat of the Provincial Assembly of Balochistan as a candidate of National Party from Constituency PB-30 (Kachhi-I) but was unsuccessful. He received 1,256 votes and lost the seat to Mir Mohammad Asim Kurd Gello.

References

Baloch nationalists
Living people
Baloch people
Pakistani MNAs 2013–2018
People from Kalat District
National Party (Pakistan) politicians
1972 births